Admiral of the Fleet John Cronyn Tovey, 1st Baron Tovey,  (7 March 1885 –  12 January 1971), sometimes known as Jack Tovey, was a Royal Navy officer. During the First World War he commanded the destroyer  at the Battle of Jutland and then commanded the destroyer  at the Second Battle of Heligoland Bight. During the Second World War he initially served as Second-in-Command of the Mediterranean Fleet in which role he commanded the Mediterranean Fleet's Light Forces (i.e. cruisers and destroyers). After that he became Commander-in-Chief, The Nore with responsibility for controlling the east coast convoys and organising minesweeping operations.

Early life and career
Tovey was born on 7 March 1885 at Borley Hill, Rochester, Kent, the youngest child (of eleven) of Lieutenant Colonel Hamilton Tovey, RE, and Maria Elizabeth Goodhue. He was educated at Durnford School, Langton Matravers (joining the school shortly before another future British admiral, Geoffrey Oliver) and as a naval cadet in the training ship Britannia at Dartmouth (15 January 1900 – 15 May 1901). Tovey's parents spent much time abroad and as a result, Durnford and its headmaster, Thomas Pellatt, were a significant and happy influence upon the young Tovey. He excelled at sports, playing well at cricket for Durnford and he was a schoolboy international footballer and later played golf for the Royal Navy.

Tovey passed out of Britannia with four months' time awarded (effectively an improvement in seniority) and entered the Royal Navy on 15 May 1901 as a midshipman. A month later he was posted to the battleship , flagship of the Channel Squadron, Vice-Admiral Arthur Wilson. He remained in Majestic until June 1902, when he transferred to the cruiser , flagship on the North America and West Indies Station. Tovey passed his Seamanship examination (1st class) and on his promotion to sub-lieutenant on 15 July 1904, he was transferred from Ariadne. In his time as a midshipman, his performance ratings had all been good or better with comments such as "zealous" and "painstaking", although not without criticisms ("Painstaking & steady" and "Manner bad with the men").

In 1905, Tovey attended courses in gunnery, torpedo, navigation and pilotage. In November, he was appointed to the flagship, at the request of Admiral Sir Arthur Wilson, the Commander-in-Chief of the Channel Fleet. Tovey's length of service on Exmouth is unclear, but he was promoted to lieutenant on 15 July 1906.

Tovey was appointed, on 18 May 1908, to the armoured cruiser , on the China Station, where he served for two years. During 1910, 1911 and 1912, there was a series of appointments to ships of differing types.

He was promoted to lieutenant-commander on 15 July 1914.

First World War
Tovey continued to serve on Amphion as its first lieutenant until she was mined and sunk on 6 August 1914 (the first British warship to be sunk in the First World War). He was subsequently posted to the destroyer .

Tovey received his first command on 13 January 1915, when he was appointed to the destroyer , which as part of the 1st Destroyer Flotilla, took part in the Battle of Dogger Bank on 24 January. He subsequently commanded  (from 7 May 1916) at the Battle of Jutland on 31 May. Onslow and another destroyer, had escorted the seaplane carrier , but later Onslow became involved in action, first against German battlecruisers, then in an attack on the damaged German cruiser  and finally on a line of enemy battleships. Onslow had been severely damaged during the attack on the Wiesbaden, nonetheless, Tovey ordered that the remaining torpedoes be fired at the battleships, although no hits were scored. As a result of this action, Tovey was promoted to commander (effective 30 June 1916), Mentioned in Dispatches and subsequently awarded the DSO in 1919.

Tovey remained on Onslow until October 1917, when he transferred to command the new destroyer HMS Ursa, which he commanded at the Second Battle of Heligoland Bight in November 1917. It was during this time that he was awarded the Croix de Guerre. In April 1918, Tovey took command of another new destroyer, and was also appointed to the staff of the Captain Superintendent Torpedo-Boat Destroyers; these appointments lasted until June 1919, after the war's end.

Inter-war years
In June 1919, Tovey attended the Senior Officers' Technical Course at the Royal Naval College, Greenwich, for a year; subsequently he was appointed to the Naval Staff Operations Division at the Admiralty for a further two years. His next sea appointment, in August 1922, was to command HMS Seawolf, which he held until his promotion to captain on 31 December 1923. In August 1924, Tovey was briefly appointed as Captain (D), 2nd Destroyer Flotilla, for exercises before attending a course at the Senior Officers' School, Sheerness.

At the end of 1924, Tovey was appointed as Captain (D) to command HMS Bruce and the 8th Destroyer Flotilla. He commanded the 8thDF and other flotillas, in turn, until he attended the Imperial Defence Course, for a year from mid January 1927, at the Imperial Defence College. This was immediately followed by the Senior Officers' Technical Course at Portsmouth and from February 1928 to April 1930, Tovey was assistant director of Tactical School, followed by yet another shore appointment at the Admiralty as Naval Assistant to the Second Sea Lord.

After five years ashore, Tovey was given command of the battleship  in April 1932. This ship had been heavily involved in the recent Invergordon mutiny and elements of its crew were among the most vociferous protestors, and Tovey was seen as a "safe pair of hands" to restore the battleship's efficiency. Tovey quickly transformed the ship's crew into an efficient and confident unit and in his confidential personnel report, Admiral Sir John Kelly judged that Tovey "... has brought his ship to a high state of fighting efficiency". He stayed with Rodney until August 1934.

In October, Tovey attended a Senior Officers' course and in January 1935, he was appointed as commodore (2nd rank) (at the time "commodore" was not a substantive rank) to command the Naval Barracks at Chatham, an important depot and training establishment involved in the rapid naval expansion of the 1930s. When promoted to rear admiral on 27 August 1935, he continued at Chatham until he attended a Senior Officers Tactical Course from September 1937 and a Senior Officers' War Course at the Royal Naval War College, Greenwich, in December 1937. Until February 1938, Tovey also acted as Naval ADC to the King.

Tovey had been nominated in early 1935 to be Rear Admiral (D), commanding the Destroyer Flotillas of the Mediterranean Fleet, the appointment not taking effect until early 1938. Once in post at Malta, Tovey's role involved interventions in the Spanish Civil War and at Haifa as well as the command and administrative roles of bringing the destroyer flotillas to peak efficiency. He was promoted to vice admiral on 3 May 1939.

Second World War
For some months after Britain and Germany had declared war, the Mediterranean was effectively a quiet backwater. Italy remained nominally neutral with her fleet as only a potential threat and France maintained a powerful naval force as a counter to the Italians. As a result, British naval forces were reduced as units were transferred to meet immediate threats elsewhere and Tovey's command was reduced to five elderly Australian  and V and W-class destroyers 

When Italy declared war in June 1940, Tovey was commanding the Mediterranean Fleet's Light Forces (i.e. cruisers and destroyers) and had become Second-in-Command of the Mediterranean Fleet, under Andrew Cunningham.

In his first action in the Mediterranean, Tovey commanded the 7th Cruiser Squadron when, on 28 June 1940, it intercepted three Italian destroyers that were making an urgent supply run to north Africa (Battle of the Espero Convoy). The five British cruisers engaged the Italian flotilla at extreme range and succeeding in sinking the Espero, while the other two escaped. The British use of ammunition had been extensive and, due to this and the shortage of stores at Alexandria, planned convoys from Malta were postponed. Cunningham was not pleased and commented that the ammunition used was "tremendous ... to sink this one 1,000-ton destroyer".

On 9 July, Tovey commanded the Light Forces (cruisers and destroyers) at the indecisive Battle of Calabria. Although little was achieved by either fleet, Tovey's handling of his command was praised in Cunningham's subsequent report. In October 1940 he became Commander of the 1st Battle Squadron.

In November 1940 Tovey was appointed Commander-in-Chief of the Home Fleet with the acting rank of admiral (he was promoted to the substantive rank on 30 October 1942). As commander of the Home Fleet he had several clashes with Dudley Pound, the First Sea Lord, and Winston Churchill but retained the post for the normal two and a half years' duration.

He had insisted on being a "sea-going" admiral, despite pressure from above and the disadvantages of being away from command centres. He believed that this was one element in maintaining morale in the fleet, by sharing the privations and dangers of his men. The final action against the Bismarck added further weight to his decision. When the two British battleships  and  located Bismarck, they had the setting sun silhouetting them while Bismarck remained in the evening gloom. Tovey observed this and, to the surprise of his staff, ordered that the final action be delayed until the following morning. In so doing, he ensured that the benefits of the light would be reversed to the British advantage and that the German crews would be fatigued by constant harassment by Vian's destroyers. The risk was that Bismarck would, somehow, escape but Tovey accepted this. Tovey was made a KBE "... for distinguished services in the masterly and determined action in which the German Battleship Bismarck was destroyed."

Tovey was appalled and a row ensued between Tovey and his superior, Pound. Tovey stated that the two officers had acted correctly in the circumstances. He threatened to resign his position and appear at any court-martial as 'defendant's friend' and defence witness. No more was heard of the proposal. King George V was extremely short of fuel and had stayed at the scene far longer than Tovey had thought it could, so another cause for friction between Tovey and his political and professional superiors was a signal that his flagship was to remain in action until Bismarck had sunk, "Bismarck must be sunk at all costs ... even if it ... means towing King George V". In these circumstances it would have been highly likely that the ship would have been lost to either U-boats or aircraft. The signal had initially caused amusement amongst Tovey and his staff, but later its risks and implications angered them; Tovey later said "It was the stupidest and most ill-considered signal ever made" and he made it clear that he would have disobeyed and risked court-martial.

Tovey also had responsibility for the safe passage of the Arctic Convoys to Russia. The Soviet Union subsequently awarded him the Order of Suvorov, First Class, for "distinguished services in securing the passage of convoys to the U.S.S.R.", but Tovey never wore the medal or its ribbon. He had repeated disagreements with Pound and Churchill over the conduct of these convoys, arguing that summer operations were too dangerous due to the long daylight hours and the lack of air cover. The disastrous PQ17 convoy, in June and July 1942, demonstrated the validity of Tovey's fears, exacerbated by Pound's poor decision to scatter the convoy. Arctic convoys were suspended until September, when close air cover was available and darkness offered protection.

Despite these serious differences and although Churchill considered Tovey to be "obstructionist" and attempted to get him sacked, Tovey lasted the full two and a half years of his appointment.

In June 1943, Tovey became Commander-in-Chief, The Nore, with responsibility for controlling the east coast convoys and organising minesweeping operations. He was promoted to Admiral of the Fleet on 22 October 1943. Other major responsibilities were the organisation of the logistics for the forthcoming Allied invasion of Sicily and the Normandy landings. He was appointed as First and Principal Naval ADC to the King in January 1945.

Retirement
Tovey retired from the service early in 1946 and was ennobled as Baron Tovey, of Langton Matravers in the County of Dorset on 15 February 1946. In retirement, Tovey took up a number of appointments; his seat in the House of Lords, Third Church Estates Commissioner (1948–1952), President of The Royal Naval Benevolent Trust and of the King George's Fund for Sailors and President of the Shaftesbury Training Ships. These kept him so busy that he had little time for his pastimes of golf and fishing. His wife, Aida, suffered from arthritis and, as the condition worsened, Tovey gave up his external activities to devote his time to caring for her. He died at Funchal, Madeira on 12 January 1971. His wife, Aida, had died the preceding June, and both are buried at Godlingston Cemetery (plot B500) just outside Swanage. The couple had had no children, and his peerage became extinct on his death.

Family
On 28 March 1916, Tovey married Aida Rowe, daughter of John Rowe, at Linlithgow. They had no children.

Character
Confidential reports on Tovey by his commanding officers shine a light on his personality and his abilities. In his early years in the Navy, the most used adjective was "zealous" and in later years, he was consistently praised for his ability and potential. In two instances, in command of a destroyer flotilla and of HMS Rodney, his impact on the efficiency of his command was noted. Tovey's ability to command respect was also commended.

There are several documented illustrations of Tovey's willingness to confront higher authorities when he believed it was right to do so. An early example was when, as a midshipman on the Exmouth supervising the handling of ships' boats, a superior officer started to give the orders. Tovey "peeled off his white gloves, unbuckled his sword belt, handed them to the astonished Commander and went below."

While in command of HMS Rodney, Tovey did not always see eye to eye with his Commander-in-Chief and was inclined to express his views forcibly. In later years he often quoted one paragraph from Sir John Kelly's confidential report: "Captain Tovey shares one characteristic with me. In myself I call it tenacity of purpose; in Captain Tovey I can only describe it as sheer bloody obstinacy".

Honours and awards

Notes

References

Sources

External links

 At Sea: Tovey for Forbes (Time Magazine, 28 Oct. 1940)
 Home waters and the Arctic 1 January – 31 May 1943
 

|-

1885 births
1971 deaths
Graduates of the Royal College of Defence Studies
Knights Grand Cross of the Order of the Bath
Knights Commander of the Order of the British Empire
Companions of the Distinguished Service Order
Recipients of the Order of St. Anna, 3rd class
Recipients of the Croix de Guerre 1914–1918 (France)
Recipients of the Order of Suvorov, 1st class
Foreign recipients of the Legion of Merit
Grand Crosses of the Order of the Phoenix (Greece)
Royal Navy admirals of the fleet
Royal Navy admirals of World War II
Royal Navy officers of World War I
Recipients of the Order of the Phoenix with Swords (Greece)
People educated at Durnford School
Graduates of the Royal Naval College, Greenwich
Church Estates Commissioners
Barons created by George VI
Military personnel from Kent